The 2021 Wake Forest Demon Deacons women's soccer team represented Wake Forest University during the 2021 NCAA Division I women's soccer season.  The Demon Deacons were led by head coach Tony Da Luz, in his nineteenth season.  They played home games at Spry Stadium.  This is the team's 27th season playing organized women's college soccer, all of which have been played in the Atlantic Coast Conference.

The Demon Deacons finished the season 16–6–0 overall, and 6–4–0 in ACC play to finish in sixth place.  As the sixth seed in the ACC Tournament, they defeated Duke in the First Round before losing in overtime to eventual champions Florida State in the Semifinals.  They received an at-large bid to the NCAA Tournament.  As an unseeded team, they defeated Harvard in the First Round before losing to Michigan in the Second Round to end their season.

Previous season 

Due to the COVID-19 pandemic, the ACC played a reduced schedule in 2020 and the NCAA Tournament was postponed to 2021.  The ACC did not play a spring league schedule, but did allow teams to play non-conference games that would count toward their 2020 record in the lead up to the NCAA Tournament.

The Demon Deacons finished the fall season 3–5–1, 3–4–1 in ACC play to finish in ninth place. They did not qualify for the ACC Tournament.  They finished the spring season 2–2–1 and were not invited to the NCAA Tournament.

Squad

Roster

Team management

Source:

Schedule

Source:

|-
!colspan=6 style=""| Exhibition

|-
!colspan=6 style=""| Non-Conference Regular Season

|-
!colspan=6 style=""| ACC Regular Season

|-
!colspan=6 style=""| ACC Tournament

|-
!colspan=6 style=""| NCAA Tournament

Rankings

2022 NWSL Draft

Source:

References

Wake Forest
Wake Forest
2021
Wake Forest women's soccer
Wake Forest